Pak Jong-ran (born March 24, 1966) is a North Korean sport shooter. She won two gold medals in the women's skeet at the 1990 Asian Games in Beijing, China, and at the 1991 ISSF World Shooting Championships in Perth, Western Australia, with scores of 197 and 191 targets, respectively.

Pak made her official debut for the 1992 Summer Olympics in Barcelona, where she placed thirty-third in mixed skeet shooting, with a score of 144 hits, tying her position with eight other shooters including Egypt's Mohamed Khorshed and Norway's Harald Jensen.

Sixteen years after competing in her last Olympics, Pak qualified for her second North Korean team, as a 42-year-old, at the 2008 Summer Olympics in Beijing, by winning the gold medal in the women's skeet from the 2007 Asian Shooting Championships in Kuwait City, Kuwait. She placed ninth in the qualifying rounds of the women's skeet shooting, by three points ahead of Romania's Lucia Mihalache from the second attempt, with a total score of 66 targets.

References

External links
NBC 2008 Olympics profile

North Korean female sport shooters
Skeet shooters
Living people
Olympic shooters of North Korea
Shooters at the 1992 Summer Olympics
Shooters at the 2008 Summer Olympics
Asian Games medalists in shooting
1966 births
Shooters at the 1990 Asian Games
Shooters at the 2002 Asian Games
Shooters at the 2006 Asian Games
Asian Games gold medalists for North Korea
Asian Games silver medalists for North Korea
Medalists at the 1990 Asian Games
Medalists at the 2006 Asian Games
20th-century North Korean women
21st-century North Korean women